Ahmed Idrees (born April 5, 1982 in Aleppo) is a Syrian football player who is currently playing for Al-Yarmouk in the Jordan League.

References

External links
 
 eurosport.com

1982 births
Living people
Syrian footballers
Syrian expatriate footballers
Syrian expatriate sportspeople in Jordan
Expatriate footballers in Jordan
Association football midfielders
Sportspeople from Aleppo
Al-Arabi (Jordan) players
Al-Yarmouk FC (Jordan) players
Al-Hussein SC (Irbid) players
Kufrsoum SC players
Mansheyat Bani Hasan players
Syrian Premier League players